</noinclude>

The public railway company Staatsspoorwegen built the line as part of the Western railways in order to improve connectivity with the western regions on Java.

The 55.8 km long line was in use between 18 June 1906 and 1982. Parts of the infrastructure are still present.

Between 1944 and 1951, a branch line went from Saketi to the south coast near Bayah, Lebak.

Stations
The following is a list of stations in order of position on this railway:

Warunggunung
Cibuah
Pasirtangkil

Cibiuk
Cimenyan
Kadukacang
Sekong
Cipeucang
Cikadueun
, with a branch line to Bayah
Sodong
Kenanga

Babakanlor
Kalumpang

References

3 ft 6 in gauge railways in Indonesia
Railway lines opened in 1906
Railway lines closed in 1982
Railway lines in Indonesia
1906 establishments in Germany